Trinity Fatu (née McCray; born November 30, 1987) is an American professional wrestler and dancer. She is currently signed to WWE, where she performs under the ring name Naomi.

In August 2009, Naomi signed with World Wrestling Entertainment (WWE) and was assigned to its past developmental territory Florida Championship Wrestling (FCW), where she was the inaugural FCW Divas Champion. In August 2010, she competed in the all-female third season of NXT, where she came in second place. In January 2012, she made her main roster debut alongside Cameron, forming The Funkadactyls. Since July 2013, Naomi has appeared as one of the main cast members of the reality television series Total Divas.

In February 2017, Naomi won the WWE SmackDown Women's Championship at the Elimination Chamber event, becoming the first African-American woman to capture the title. She would then become the inaugural winner of the WrestleMania Women's Battle Royal at WrestleMania 34 the following year and the WWE Women's Tag Team Champion alongside Sasha Banks at WrestleMania 38 in 2022.

Early life 
Trinity McCray was born in Sanford, Florida. Before starting a career in wrestling, she was one of the dancers for the Orlando Magic. She also starred as a background dancer for rapper Flo Rida.

Professional wrestling career

World Wrestling Entertainment/WWE

Developmental territories (2009–2011) 
In August 2009, Fatu signed a contract with WWE, where she reported to their then-developmental territory Florida Championship Wrestling (FCW). She and Alex Riley lost to AJ Lee and Brett DiBiase in a mixed tag team match in October. On June 20, 2010 Naomi defeated Serena Deeb on FCW TV to become the inaugural FCW Divas Champion. On the August 29 episode of FCW TV, Naomi competed in a match against Lee, where both the Queen of FCW title and the FCW Divas Championship were on the line, which ended in a double count-out. In 2010 Naomi joined the all-female third season of NXT, with Kelly Kelly as her pro. Naomi debuted on the September 7 episode of NXT, where she teamed with Kelly to face fellow rookie Maxine and Alicia Fox in winning effort after Naomi pinned Maxine. On the September 21 episode of NXT, she teamed with Kelly and Jamie Keyes, defeating Layla, Michelle McCool, and Kaitlyn. On the October 26 episode of NXT, Naomi defeated Maxine in a singles match. On November 30, Naomi lost the competition to Kaitlyn, placing second in the season. On the January 23, 2011, Naomi lost the championship to Lee on FCW TV.

The Funkadactyls (2012–2014) 

On the January 9, 2012, Naomi made her main roster debut on Raw alongside Cameron as valets for Brodus Clay, with the duo dubbed The Funkadactyls. On the TLC pre-show on December 16, Naomi scored a victory in a Santa's Little Helpers battle royal, earning a match against Divas Champion Eve Torres later that night, where she lost. On the March 15, 2013, episode of SmackDown, The Funkadactyls were attacked backstage by The Bella Twins. The Funkadactyls, Clay, and Tensai, collectively known as Tons of Funk, were originally set to face Team Rhodes Scholars (Cody Rhodes and Damien Sandow) and the Bella Twins in an eight-person mixed tag team match at WrestleMania 29, but after the match was cut due to time constraints, it instead took place the following night on Raw, with Tons of Funk coming out victorious.

On the August 26 episode of Raw, Naomi was ringside for a match between Natalya and Brie Bella alongside the cast of Total Divas, also including Cameron, Nikki Bella, Eva Marie, and JoJo, which ended with Divas Champion AJ Lee coming out and cutting a worked shoot promo directed at the women. On the September 15, Naomi competed against Natalya, Brie Bella, and Lee in a fatal four-way match for the Divas Championship at Night of Champions, where Lee retained the title. The cast of Total Divas went on to defeat Lee, Alicia Fox, Aksana, Kaitlyn, Rosa Mendes, Tamina Snuka, and Summer Rae in a traditional elimination tag team match at Survivor Series. On December 15 at TLC: Tables, Ladders & Chairs, Naomi, Cameron and Tensai abandoned Clay due to his attitude.

In February 2014, Naomi suffered a legitimate displaced fracture of the orbital bone during a match against Aksana on Raw. She returned on the March 17 episode of Raw, teaming with Cameron to defeat Lee and Snuka in a tag team match. On April 6 at WrestleMania XXX, Naomi competed in the Vickie Guerrero Invitational match for the Lee's Divas Championship, where Lee successfully retained her title. At Money in the Bank, Naomi lost to the new Divas Champion Paige in a title match. On the July 7 episode of Raw, Naomi and Cameron lost to Lee and Paige in a tag team match, which caused a brawl to ensue between Cameron and Naomi. Naomi and Cameron faced off on the Battleground pre-show, during which the former lost. Naomi went on to secure a victory over Cameron on the September 15 episode of Raw. At Survivor Series, Naomi participated in a traditional elimination tag team match, where she eliminated Cameron before eventually pinning Paige to get the win for her team in a clean sweep.

Divas Revolution (2014–2016) 

In December 2014, Naomi became involved with The Usos' feud with The Miz, which involved The Miz offering to help further Naomi's musical career, much to her husband Jimmy Uso's dismay. On the December 16 episode of Super SmackDown, Naomi competed against Nikki Bella for the Divas Championship, where she lost the match after Jimmy Uso caused a distraction due to his anger of The Miz being present. After Alicia Fox joined The Miz and Mizdow, Naomi and the Usos competed against the three in a series of mixed tag team matches, where Naomi's team repeatedly lost. On March 29, she accompanied The Usos during their match on the WrestleMania 31 pre-show, in which they unsuccessfully challenged Kidd and Cesaro for the WWE Tag Team Championship.

On the April 13 episode of Raw, Naomi unsuccessfully competed in a battle royal to determine the number one contender to the Divas Championship. After the bout, Naomi attacked Paige for eliminating her to ultimately win the match, turning heel. As Paige had been injured by the attack, Naomi was granted a match against Bella for the title at Extreme Rules, where she failed to win after interference from Brie Bella. In May, Naomi attacked The Bella Twins alongside the returning Tamina. The duo went on to compete in a tag team match against The Bella Twins at Payback, during which Naomi and Tamina won. On the May 18 episode of Raw, Naomi competed in another championship match against Nikki Bella, where Bella retained the title after Tamina caused a disqualification. After Paige returned, a triple threat match was made between Naomi, Paige, and Nikki Bella at Elimination Chamber, however she once again failed to capture the title.

On the July 13 episode of Raw, after weeks of the Divas division being dominated by The Bella Twins and their ally Alicia Fox, Stephanie McMahon called for a "Divas Revolution," subsequently introducing the debuting NXT Women's Champion Sasha Banks to align with Naomi and Tamina, dubbed Team B.A.D., as well as Charlotte Flair and Becky Lynch to align with Paige, leading to a brawl between the three teams. The three teams faced off in a three team elimination match on August 23 at SummerSlam, which was won by Team PCB. At the 2015 Tribute to the Troops in December, Team B.A.D. and Paige defeated Brie Bella, Charlotte, Fox, and Lynch in an eight-woman tag team match. On the February 1, 2016, episode of Raw, Banks left the team, which caused Naomi and Tamina to attack her. Naomi and Tamina later lost to Banks and Lynch in a tag team match at Fastlane. On the WrestleMania 32 pre-show, Naomi and Tamina teamed up with Lana, Emma, and Summer Rae in a 10-Diva tag team match against Brie Bella, Paige, Fox, Eva Marie, and Natalya, where Naomi's team was defeated. In early May, Naomi became inactive due to a torn ankle tendon.

SmackDown Women's Champion (2016–2017) 
Naomi was drafted to the SmackDown brand on July 19 as part of the 2016 WWE draft. She then debuted a new gimmick, which included a new look and entrance, dubbed "The Glow", turning face in the process. On August 21 at SummerSlam, Naomi competed in a six-woman tag team match alongside Becky Lynch and Carmella against Natalya, Alexa Bliss, and Nikki Bella, where Naomi's team was defeated after Bella pinned Carmella. On September 11 at Backlash, Naomi competed in a six-pack elimination challenge to determine the inaugural WWE SmackDown Women's Champion, where she would eliminate Bliss before she herself was eliminated by Natalya. On November 20, Naomi competed as part of the SmackDown women's team against the Raw women's team at the Survivor Series pay-per-view, where Naomi's team was defeated.

After three months of inactivity, Naomi returned on the January 24, 2017, episode of SmackDown, in a confrontation SmackDown Women's Champion Bliss. On February 12, she competed against Bliss at Elimination Chamber, where she was victorious, becoming the SmackDown Women's Champion for the first time in her career as well as the first African-American woman to capture the title. The following Tuesday, she relinquished the title due to a legitimate injury she sustained during the match. On April 2, Naomi made her in-ring return in a six-pack challenge in her hometown of Orlando at WrestleMania 33, where she made Bliss submit, successfully regaining the SmackDown Women's Championship. Two days later, Naomi defeated Bliss in a rematch to retain the championship.

On June 18, Naomi defeated Lana to retain the SmackDown Women's Championship at Money in the Bank. She then went on to retain the title over Lana two more times on the June 27 and July 4 episodes of SmackDown, the latter of which involved a seven-second submission victory. In June, Naomi debuted a customized title belt with glow-in-the-dark lights of various colors. On August 20 at SummerSlam, Naomi dropped the SmackDown Women's Championship to Natalya, ending her reign at 140 days. On November 19 at Survivor Series, Naomi competed in a five-on-five elimination tag team match, where she eliminated Raw team captain Alicia Fox, before she herself was eliminated by Sasha Banks, with her team ultimately losing the match.

Various storylines and suspension (2018–2022) 

On January 28, 2018, Naomi competed in the inaugural women's Royal Rumble match at the namesake pay-per-view, entering at number 20 and lasting 06:49 before she was eliminated by Nia Jax. On the WrestleMania 34 kick-off show, Naomi went on to win the inaugural WrestleMania Women's Battle Royal by eliminating Bayley. In June, Naomi competed in her first Money in the Bank ladder match at the namesake pay-per-view, won by Alexa Bliss. On October 28, she took part in the first all-women's pay-per-view, Evolution, competing in a women's battle royal match, which was won by Jax. In November at Survivor Series, she competed in a traditional elimination tag team match as part of Team SmackDown, where she was the first woman eliminated from the match by Tamina.

Naomi then entered a feud with Mandy Rose after Rose started flirting with Naomi's real-life husband, Jimmy Uso, to "ruin Naomi's life", which involved Rose hinting at kissing Uso as well as Naomi attacking Rose in a hotel room to which Rose invited Uso. At Royal Rumble on January 27, 2019, Naomi and Rose eliminated each other during the women's Royal Rumble match. The two exchanged victories over each other in February. That same month, Naomi teamed up with Carmella in a six-team Elimination Chamber match for the inaugural WWE Women's Tag Team Championship at the namesake pay-per-view, where they were the first team eliminated. During the 2019 WWE Superstar Shake-up on April 15, Naomi was drafted to the Raw brand. She unsuccessfully competed in the women's Money in the Bank ladder match at the namesake pay-per-view the following month.

At Royal Rumble on January 26, 2020, Naomi returned from a hiatus by entering the Royal Rumble match at number 18, lasting 22 minutes before being eliminated by Shayna Baszler. She later attributed her time away to health issues and a relative's death. The following month, Naomi lost to Bayley in a match for the SmackDown Women's Championship at Super Showdown. In April at WrestleMania 36, Naomi competed in a five-way elimination match for the same title, during which she was eliminated by Sasha Banks. In September, she underwent surgery to remove a fibroid.

As part of the 2020 Draft in October, Naomi was drafted back to the Raw brand. She returned at Royal Rumble in January 2021 during the 30-woman Royal Rumble match, entering at number 2, where she was eliminated by Shayna Baszler and Nia Jax. She teamed with Lana to compete in a Tag Team Turmoil match during the first night of WrestleMania 37 to determine the No. 1 contenders for the Women's Tag Team Championship, where the duo was defeated. In August 2021, Naomi became part of the SmackDown roster. She subsequently began a feud with Sonya Deville, who was an authority figure. The feud developed due to the Naomi's persistence in asking for matches, irritating Deville. Naomi and Deville eliminated each other from the Royal Rumble match at the namesake event in January 2022. Naomi teamed up with Ronda Rousey to defeat Deville and Charlotte Flair at Elimination Chamber the next month.

On the second night of WrestleMania 38, Naomi teamed with Sasha Banks to compete in a four-way tag team match for the WWE Women's Tag Team Championship, in which they defeated the respective teams of Liv Morgan and Rhea Ripley, Natalya and Shayna Baszler, and titleholders Carmella and Queen Zelina to become the new WWE Women's Tag Team Champions. During the May 16 episode of Raw, Naomi and Banks legitimately walked out of the show's venue over a creative dispute after a meeting with CEO Vince McMahon. WWE released an official statement on the issue, in which the company stated Banks and Naomi "walked into WWE Head of Talent Relations John Laurinaitis' office with their suitcases in hand, placed their tag team championship belts on his desk and walked out". This caused a change to the show's main event that originally involved both women. Naomi and Banks were suspended indefinitely and the title was vacated.

Other media

Video games 
 Naomi made her in-game debut in WWE '13 as a non-player character along with her then-tag team partner Cameron, appearing during Brodus Clay's entrance and winning celebration, as well as in WWE 2K14. She later appeared as a playable character in WWE 2K15, WWE 2K16, WWE 2K17, WWE 2K18, WWE 2K19, WWE 2K20, WWE 2K Battlegrounds and WWE 2K22.

Television 
 Since July 2013, Naomi has been a main cast member of the reality television series Total Divas produced by WWE and E!. In May 2014, Naomi released her first single song entitled "Dance All Night", and the accompanying music video was released on WWE's YouTube channel. She was not part of the second half of season three that aired January 2015 to March 2015 but returned as a main cast member for season four. She did not appear during the show's fifth season but once again returned as a main cast member for the sixth season.

Film 
 In 2017, Naomi starred in WWE Studios film The Marine 5: Battleground, playing the role of a gang member named Murphy.

Others 
 Naomi made her modeling debut at New York Fashion Week alongside Sasha Banks in September 2022.

Personal life 
Trinity and longtime boyfriend Jonathan Fatu, better known by the ring name Jimmy Uso, were married in Maui on January 16, 2014. Through their marriage, she is a member of the Anoaʻi family, a Samoan-American wrestling dynasty. The couple resides in Pensacola, Florida. She is the stepmother to Fatu's two children.

Filmography

Championships and accomplishments 

 Florida Championship Wrestling
 FCW Divas Championship (1 time)
 FCW Divas Championship Tournament (2010)
 Pro Wrestling Illustrated
 Ranked No. 7 of the top 50 female wrestlers in the PWI Female 50 in 2015
 Rolling Stone
 Most Welcome Heel Turn (2015) 
 Wrestling Observer Newsletter
 Worst Feud of the Year (2015) Team PCB vs. Team B.A.D. vs. Team Bella
 Worst Worked Match of the Year (2013) 
 WWE
 WWE SmackDown Women's Championship (2 times)
 WWE Women's Tag Team Championship (1 time) – with Sasha Banks
 WrestleMania Women's Battle Royal (2018)
 Slammy Award (1 time)
 Best Dance Moves of the Year (2013) – with Cameron as The Funkadactyls
 WWE Year-End Award (1 time)
 Most Underrated Superstar of the Year (2018)

References

External links 

 
 
 

1987 births
African-American female professional wrestlers
American cheerleaders
American female dancers
American dancers
American female models
American female professional wrestlers
Anoa'i family
Living people
National Basketball Association cheerleaders
Professional wrestling dancers
Sportspeople from Sanford, Florida
21st-century African-American sportspeople
21st-century African-American women
20th-century African-American people
20th-century African-American women
21st-century professional wrestlers
WWE SmackDown Women's Champions
WWE Women's Tag Team Champions
FCW Divas Champions